Hermann Guido von Samson-Himmelstjerna; name sometimes given as Guido Samson von Himmelstiern (Korast – , Dorpat) was a Baltic German physician and professor of Staatsarzneikunde (state pharmacopoeia).

From 1826 he studied medicine at the University of Dorpat, earning his doctorate in 1834. Afterwards he continued his education at the Frederick William's University of Berlin, the University of Würzburg and the University of Vienna, where he studied with Karl von Rokitansky (1804-1878). From 1845 until his death in 1868 he was a medical professor at Dorpat. From 1865 until his death he was also the rector. He was the president of the Estonian Naturalists' Society in 1862–1868.

In 1856–58 with ophthalmologist Georg von Oettingen (1824-1916), he conducted statistical research of over 650,000 inhabitants of Livonia in regard to eye disease and blindness. The two doctors included their findings in a treatise titled Populäre Anleitung zur Pflege und Behandlung der unter der ländlichen Bevölkerung in den Ostseevrovinzen Rußlands in sondere in Livland am häufigsten vorkommenden Augenkrankheiten (Popular Guide to the Care and Treatment of the Rural Population in the Russian Baltic Provinces, particularly in Livonia in regard to Common Diseases of the Eye, 1860).

References 
  translated biography Allgemeine Deutsche Biographie
 Parts of this article are based on a translation of an article on Georg von Oettingen from the German Wikipedia.

1809 births
1868 deaths
People from Kanepi Parish
People from the Governorate of Livonia
Baltic-German people
Academic staff of the University of Tartu
Rectors of the University of Tartu
Burials at Raadi cemetery